Gonjiam: Haunted Asylum is a 2018 South Korean found footage horror film directed by Jung Bum-shik. Based on a real-life psychiatric hospital of the same name, it stars Wi Ha-joon, Park Ji-hyun, Oh Ah-yeon, Moon Ye-won, Park Sung-hoon, Yoo Je-yoon and Lee Seung-wook in the lead roles. The narrative centers around a horror web series crew that travels to an abandoned asylum for a live broadcast in order to garner views and publicity.

The film opened theatrically in South Korea on 28 March 2018 and in the United States on 13 April 2018. A commercial success, it also became the third most-watched horror film in South Korea after A Tale of Two Sisters and Phone. Later, it was screened at the 20th Udine Far East Film Festival.

Plot 
Two boys are recording their exploration of the abandoned Gonjiam Psychiatric Hospital, where rumor states that the ping pong-loving director of the hospital killed all of the patients and went missing. The two head to Room 402, the intensive care unit, which no one has been able to open before. They try to open the door but suddenly hear a ping pong ball. Their broadcast abruptly ends but not before catching a glimpse of a ghostly face. After seeing news of the teenagers' disappearance, Ha-Joon, owner of YouTube channel "Horror Times", decides to explore the building.

Ha-Joon gets together a group of six people (three girls: Ah-Yeon, Charlotte, and Ji-Hyun; and three boys: Sung-Hoon, Seung-Wook, and Je-Yoon) for a live broadcast. Ha-Joon stays at their base camp off the road to control the broadcast while the rest of the group will go inside. They tie underwear to a tree as a marker. Inside, Charlotte pours holy water in a small dish to record its reactions. In the director's office, they find a group photo with all the patients and staff. Ji-Hyun and Charlotte find a doll in the lab, which they later discover has moved on its own. They see that it is the same doll held by one of the patients in the group photo.

Je-Yoon and Ah-Yeon try to open the door to Room 402, while the other four explore the "Group Treatment Room," where there are many strange coffins with holes in them. When Ji-Hyun puts her hand in a hole, her hand is pulled and wounded. Disturbed, Ji-Hyun and Charlotte decide to leave. Ha-Joon reviews footage of all six participants standing together and becomes disturbed as well, unsure who filmed it if all six were in the shot. Outside, Charlotte and Ji-Hyun encounter the underwear marker more than once, revealing that they are somehow going in circles. Ji-Hyun goes into a trance and her eyes open completely black. Frightened, Charlotte flees toward the base camp but finds herself back at the asylum in Room 402. Ji-Hyun is in a corner with the doll. A naked man appears and Charlotte is attacked and pulled into the darkness.

Seung-Wook and Sung-Hoon see a wheelchair moving by itself in the basement. Everything in the room begins to float, and both boys are knocked out by flying objects. Seung-Wook awakes and is dragged away by an invisible force. Sung-Hoon wakes and runs to Je-Yoon and Ah-Yeon, who are still trying to open the door to Room 402. Sung-Hoon informs them that the show was meant to be scripted, but real paranormal forces have attacked them and they need to rescue Seung-Wook. Suddenly, a ping-pong ball bounces toward them and Charlotte's screaming is heard from inside Room 402. The infra-red cameras start to flash, detecting a presence. Room 402 opens and the screen goes dark.

Sung-Hoon, Je-Yoon, and Ah-Yeon find themselves in a dark room with no exit, standing in knee-deep water. Numerous ghosts appear and they are possessed one after the other and eventually swallowed by the darkness. Ha-Joon, seeing his view count nearly reaching 1 million views, goes to investigate and gets strangled to death, seemingly by the ghost of the director herself. The last one remaining, Seung-Wook, awakens and finds himself strapped to a wheelchair and is the final one to be pulled into Room 402.

The epilogue shows that, despite everyone's continued broadcast, the livestream had actually cut off after Sung-Hoon admitted the stream was supposed to be scripted. The viewers, none the wiser, mock the failed stream. Additionally, the view count had not gotten anywhere near 1 million (despite what Ha-Joon saw on his monitor) and had only peaked to 503 views. In the final scene, the dish of holy water starts to boil.

Cast
 Wi Ha-joon as Ha-Joon
 Park Ji-hyun as Ji-Hyun
 Oh Ah-yeon as Ah-Yeon
 Moon Ye-won as Charlotte
 Park Sung-hoon as Sung-Hoon
 Yoo Je-yoon as Je-Yoon
 Lee Seung-wook as Seung-Wook
 Park Ji-a as Hospital Director / Director’s Ghost

Production
The film takes place in the former Gonjiam Psychiatric Hospital in Gwangju, Gyeonggi Province, purportedly one of Korea's most haunted locations. In 2012, CNN Travel selected it as one of "7 freakiest places on the planet."

Most of the scenes in the film were filmed in the National Maritime High School in Busan, with the production team adhering closely to the floor plan of the actual hospital to recreate exactly the same exterior and hallways.

Controversy
Before the release of the film, the owner of the asylum filed a lawsuit against the film being shown in theaters, claiming that the film will have negative effects on the sale of the building. However, a Seoul court in late March 2018 ruled in favor of the film being shown. On 28 May 2018 Gonjiam Psychiatric Hospital was demolished.

Release
The film released in South Korea on 28 March 2018.

In April 2018, just days after the film was released, actor Lee Seung-wook who made his debut with the film announced his departure from the entertainment industry. The actor, who was reportedly absent from promotional activities for the film, cited personal reasons for the decision.

Reception
Gonjiam: Haunted Asylum came in first at the domestic box office on March 28, 2018, alongside the openings of Hollywood film Ready Player One and local film Seven Years of Night, collecting  from 198,369 admissions. Remaining at the top spot for the next four days, the film earned  from 1.37 million admissions in its opening weekend and accounted for 40% of the total weekend box office receipts, the biggest March opening ever achieved by a Korean film.

After three weekends, Gonjiam: Haunted Asylum  has attracted near to 2.6 million viewers and accumulated  in box office takings, the second biggest gross for a Korean horror film, behind 2003's A Tale of Two Sisters.

Aedan Juvet of Bleeding Cool claimed the film "mastered" found footage horror, naming it amongst some of the best of its genre.

Awards and nominations

See also
 Grave Encounters, a 2011 Canadian film with a similar setup
 Guimoon: The Lightless Door, a 2021 horror film with a similar setup

References

External links
 
 
 Gonjiam: Haunted Asylum at Naver Movies 

2018 films
South Korean horror films
2018 horror films
2010s ghost films
Camcorder films
Films about filmmaking
Films about spirit possession
Films set in abandoned buildings and structures
Films set in psychiatric hospitals
Films set in Seoul
Films shot in Seoul
Found footage films
Religious horror films
Showbox films
South Korean supernatural horror films
Warner Bros. films
2010s South Korean films